Geoff Wilson (born September 24, 1941) is a Canadian former politician.

Career 
An accountant and lawyer by profession, Wilson was first elected to the House of Commons of Canada as the Progressive Conservative Member of Parliament for Swift Current—Maple Creek, Saskatchewan in the 1984 federal election.

He was re-elected in 1988 in the new riding of Swift Current—Maple Creek—Assiniboia but defeated in 1993 by Lee Morrison of the Reform Party of Canada.

Electoral history 

|-

|Progressive Conservative
|Geoff Wilson
|align=right| 15,944 
|align=right|44.0

|New Democratic Party
|Laura Balas
|align=right|11,827 
|align=right|32.7

|Liberal 
|Paul Lewans
|align=right|7,958 
|align=right|22.0

|Liberal 
|Rob Heinrichs
|align=right|10,661
|align=right|32.4

|New Democratic Party
|Lois Ross
|align=right| 5,448 
|align=right|16.5

|Progressive Conservative
|Geoff Wilson
|align=right|5,119
|align=right|15.5

|Natural Law
|Shirley Wilson
|align=right|216 
|align=right|0.7

External links

1941 births
Living people
Members of the House of Commons of Canada from Saskatchewan
Progressive Conservative Party of Canada MPs